Independent Municipal Party of Ljusnarsberg (in Swedish: Ljusnarsbergs Obundna Kommunparti) is a local political party in Ljusnarsberg, Sweden. The party president is Maria Sahlin.

In the 1998 municipal elections, the party got six seats in the municipal council. In 2002 they lost three of the seats. In total, the party got 321 votes (10.2%). The councilors elected in 2002 were Maria Sahlin, Ulf Anagrius and Wicken Von Post.

Swedish local political parties